Scaachi Koul (born February 7, 1991) is a Canadian culture writer at BuzzFeed Canada. She is the author of the book of essays One Day We'll All Be Dead and None of This Will Matter and was one of the reporters in BuzzFeed's Netflix documentary series Follow This. Before BuzzFeed, Koul worked at Penguin Random House Canada, the acquiring publisher of her book. Her journalism has appeared in Flare, HuffPost Canada, The Thought Catalog, The Guardian, The New Yorker, The New York Times, The Globe and Mail, and other publications.

Career 
Koul freelanced while still at the Ryerson School of Journalism where she wrote for Maclean's from 2009 up until her graduation at the end of 2012. From April to November 2014 Koul wrote the "Unf*ck Yourself" column for Hazlitt. In 2015 her column was rebranded "Scaach-22" with the new tagline "managing your own privilege without being a dick".

In March 2015, while Koul was still employed by Penguin Random House Canada, they announced publication of a collection of her essays. Originally the collection was titled The Pursuit of Misery then it was changed to One Day We'll All Be Dead and None of This Will Matter. The book covers subjects including family, race, feminism, body image, and rape culture from her perspective as an Indian-Canadian woman growing up in the suburbs of Calgary. She also discusses her writing career and social media, including temporarily deactivating her Twitter account as a result of invective and threats following a request for long-form submissions from people who were not white men. Koul was praised for her wit and humour, ability to mix sarcasm and sentimentality, and for her effective use of confessional writing as a complement to analytical rigour. She received a shortlisted nomination for the 2018 Stephen Leacock Award for the best book of humour written in English by a Canadian writer.

She hosts the Scamfluencers podcast with Sarah Hagi, which covers scammers who are influencers.

Personal life
Koul was born and raised in Calgary, Alberta. She was a member of the Girl Guides of Canada and participated in their youth programs. She currently lives in New York with her cat, Sylvia Plath.  She was formerly married to Bloomberg reporter Scott Deveau.

Koul is an Indo-Canadian of Kashmiri descent, and her writing on race and shadism draws from her own life. She has stated that though she is a brown person, her fair skin has allowed her access to a kind of white privilege, and when she goes to India she is "basically acting as a white person."

References

External links

 
 

1991 births
Living people
Canadian people of Indian descent
Canadian people of Kashmiri descent
Canadian Hindus
21st-century Canadian women writers
BuzzFeed people
Kashmiri people
Kashmiri Hindus
Kashmiri Pandits
Canadian columnists
Canadian feminist writers
Canadian social commentators
Canadian women essayists
Canadian women columnists
Writers from Calgary
21st-century Canadian essayists